Tour de Force — Live is a live album by jazz guitarist Al Di Meola that was released in 1982 and recorded on February 4, 1982 at Tower Theatre in Philadelphia, Pennsylvania. Additional keyboards and percussion were overdubbed in the studio.

Track listing
All songs by Al Di Meola, except where noted.
"Elegant Gypsy Suite" – 10:10
"Nena" – 5:06
"Advantage"  – 5:00
"Egyptian Danza" – 5:41
"Race with Devil on Spanish Highway" – 7:36
"Cruisin'"  – 5:26

Personnel 
 Al Di Meola – acoustic & electric guitars
 Jan Hammer – keyboards
 Victor Godsey – keyboards
 Philippe Saisse – additional keyboards 
 Anthony Jackson – electric bass guitar
 Steve Gadd – drums, percussion
 Mingo Lewis – percussion
 Sammy Figueroa – additional percussion 
 Dennis Mackay – co-producer, engineer

Charts
Album – Billboard

References

External links 
 Al Di Meola - Tour De Force – Live (1982) album review by Scott Yanow, credits & releases at AllMusic
 Al Di Meola - Tour De Force – Live (1982) album releases & credits at Discogs
 Al Di Meola - Tour De Force – Live (1982) album credits & user reviews at ProgArchives.com
 Al Di Meola - Tour De Force – Live (1982) album to be listened as stream on Spotify

Al Di Meola albums
1982 live albums
Columbia Records live albums